Stanley Bryan Ashbrook (October 10, 1882 – January 23, 1958), of Kentucky, was a distinguished American philatelist who was known for his extensive studies of early United States stamps and postal history.  He was usually known as Stanley B. Ashbrook.

Collecting interests
Ashbrook was primarily interested in classic United States stamps and postal history in the form of stamped covers.

Philatelic activity
Ashbrook is most known for his famous two-volume book entitled The United States One Cent Stamp of 1851-57 which was published in 1938.  His research of early American postage stamps led him to author the book The United States Ten Cent Stamp of 1855-57 in 1936 for which he received the Crawford Medal in 1937.

Ashbrook published the "Ashbrook Special Service" as a private subscriber series and also contributed to another subscriber series entitled "Bulletins of the Research Group."

Honors and awards
Stanley Ashbrook received numerous honors and awards for his philatelic research and subsequent publications. These include, the first-issued  Luff Award, the Crawford Medal, and signed the Roll of Distinguished Philatelists in 1950. He is currently listed in the APS Hall of Fame.

Legacy
His philatelic estate, which included classic American postage stamps, postal history, unpublished notes, and other material was sold in 1958 at auction by the firm of H. R. Harmer.

See also
 Philatelic literature

References and sources
References

Sources
 Stanley Bryan Ashbrook

1882 births
1958 deaths
Philatelic literature
American philatelists
People from Kentucky
Signatories to the Roll of Distinguished Philatelists
American Philatelic Society